Gábor Gergely (born 21 June 1953, in Budapest) is a male former international table tennis player from Hungary.

Table tennis career
From 1974 to 1983 he won several medals in singles, doubles, and team events in the Table Tennis European Championships, three medals with the Hungarian team in the World Table Tennis Championships.

The four World Championship medals included two gold medals in the doubles with István Jónyer at the 1975 World Table Tennis Championships and the team event at the 1979 World Table Tennis Championships.

See also
 List of table tennis players
 List of World Table Tennis Championships medalists

References

 Profile at Halmay Zoltán Olympic Traditionalist Association website

Living people
1953 births
Hungarian male table tennis players
Table tennis players from Budapest